The  (abbreviation: GaG) is a Gesamtschule (comprehensive school) in Bad Homberg vor der Höhe, Hesse, Germany.

The school has approximate 70 teachers and more than 800 students. So the students get their  after twelve school years totally, not thirteen years more.

References

External links 
 Official website of the  

Schools in Hesse
Bad Homburg vor der Höhe
1973 establishments in Germany
Educational institutions established in 1973